, is a trans-Neptunian object from the scattered disc in the outermost region of the Solar System, approximately 122 kilometers in diameter. It was first observed on 7 April 2002, by American astronomer Marc Buie at Cerro Tololo Observatory in Chile.

Description 

 belongs to a small number of detached objects with perihelion distances of 30 AU or more, and semi-major axis of 200 AU or more. Such objects can not reach such orbits without some perturbing object, which lead to the speculation of Planet Nine.

This minor planet orbits the Sun at a distance of 35.3–402.7 AU once every 3,241 years and 1 month (1,183,810 days). Its orbit has an eccentricity of 0.84 and an inclination of 14° with respect to the ecliptic.

Based on an absolute magnitude of 7.8 and an assumed albedo of 0.09, the Johnston's Archive calculated a mean-diameter of 122 kilometers.

See also

References

External links 
 List Of Centaurs and Scattered-Disk Objects, Minor Planet Center
 List of known Trans-Neptunian Objects, Johnston's Archive
 
 

Minor planet object articles (unnumbered)

20020407